Beira's Place is a Scotland-based private support service for victims of sexual violence. Founded in 2022 by J. K. Rowling, the organisation describes itself as a "women-only service"; it does not include trans women among staff or recipients of care, on the basis that they were assigned male at birth.

Activities 
Beira's Place is a privately owned and operated domestic violence service that was formed to provide specialist support to women assigned female at birth aged 16 and over in Edinburgh and the Lothians who are survivors of sexual violence.

History 
The organisation was established in December 2022 by British author and philanthropist J. K. Rowling as its founder and financial backer, with the express goal of providing "women-centered and women-delivered care". Rowling said the impetus to set up the centre was her fury on hearing that the trans CEO of the Edinburgh Rape Crisis Centre had said that females must "reframe their trauma" if they disagreed with being treated by a trans woman. The organisation was named for Beira, the Scottish goddess of winter who represents "female wisdom, power, and regeneration".

The group's founding came shortly before a vote on the Gender Recognition Reform bill. Single-sex services in Scotland are a key issue associated with the bill.

Beira's Place is not a registered charity of Scotland. As such, it does not accept donations and is entirely funded by Rowling.

Alongside Rowling, the current board members of the organisation are Rhona Hotchkiss (former governor of Cornton Vale prison), Johann Lamont, Susan Smith (director of For Women Scotland), and Dr. Margaret McCartney. The founding CEO of the organisation is Isabelle Kerr MBE, formerly manager of Glasgow and Clyde Rape Crisis Centre, and its deputy CEO is Sue Domminney.

Reception 
After the founding of Beira's Place, numerous public figures and organisations expressed their support for the service. Rape Crisis Scotland publicly welcomed the new services while noting rape crisis centres in Scotland had served trans and non-binary people without incident. British author and feminist Julie Bindel wrote, "Beira’s Place will be an oasis, and hopefully signal the beginning of a new feminist revolution." Woman's Place UK released a statement of solidarity and support for the new organisation. UN Special Rapporteur on Violence Against Women Reem Alsalem welcomed the new service, stating "the prevention and response to violence against women requires an all-society approach, so it is great to see different actors who have the means, including private individuals, play their part." The Scottish Government stated, "we welcome any initiative that will support women and girls who have experienced sexual violence."

Some feminist campaigners claim that the Scottish government uses its funding discretion to force women's organisations to adopt trans-inclusive policies. Trina Budge, director of For Women Scotland, said that governing bodies prioritise ideology over the "rights and needs of vulnerable women and girls". The Scottish government denied the claim, saying: "There are categorically no requirements relating to gender self-identification." The form for funding from Equally Safe, the government's £38 million plan to "prevent and eradicate violence against women and girls", says that services must be "inclusive to lesbian, bisexual, trans and intersex women".

The organisation has been criticized by supporters of the transgender rights movement for being exclusionary towards transgender women. The Washington Examiner quoted the British transgender television personality India Willoughby who tweeted that the centre represented "an opportunity to ban trans people."

In a statement provided by the organisation, Beira's Place wrote "we believe that women deserve to have certainty that, in using our services, they will not encounter anyone who is male. Where appropriate, we will refer men or individuals identifying as trans women to other appropriate services."

References

External links 

 Beira's Place Official Website
 Beira's Place Official Twitter

2022 establishments in Scotland
Organizations established in 2022
Domestic violence-related organizations
Organisations based in Edinburgh
J. K. Rowling
LGBT-related controversies in the United Kingdom